Kaine may refer to:

 Kaine (surname), including a list of people with the name
 Kaine (city), ancient name for Qena, a city in Upper Egypt
 Kaine (Laconia), an ancient town in Laconia, Greece
 Kaine (manga), a manga by Kaori Yuki

Persons with the given name
 Kaine Bennett Charleston (born 1983), Australian film producer and actor
 Kaine Harling (born 1977), Australian film producer and cameraman
 Kaine Manihera (born 1986), New Zealand rugby player
 Kaine Parker, fictional character in comic books that is a clone of Spider-Man
 Kainé, fictional character in the 2010 video game Nier
 Kaine Robertson (born 1980), New Zealand rugby player

See also
 Caine (disambiguation)
 Kane (disambiguation)